Triadothrips is a genus of thrips in the family Phlaeothripidae.

Species
 Triadothrips arckaringa
 Triadothrips briga
 Triadothrips hesmus

References

Phlaeothripidae
Thrips
Thrips genera